Hunter Lawrence Burgan (born May 14, 1976) is an American multi-instrumentalist. He is the third and current bassist of AFI.

Biography 

Burgan was born in Los Angeles County, California and grew up in Grass Valley, California. He is a vegan.

Career 
Burgan was in a band called the Force at the time he joined California rock band AFI. He was meant to be a temporary replacement for the existing bassist, Geoff Kresge, for a few tours and a record, Shut Your Mouth and Open Your Eyes, but eventually became AFI's full-time bassist in November 1997. The Force broke up in September 1998.

Burgan loves Prince's music and even had his own side-project called Hunter Revenge dedicated to singing early-80s-style R&B. A talented multi-instrumentalist, Burgan can play drums, bass, guitar, saxophone, clarinet, and piano. He was the drummer and one of the founding members of the Frisk, who played their final show in December 2005. He was the drummer of the Nevada City, California, band, Badical Turbo Radness (BTR) in the mid 1990s. He has also played drums for the Eyeliners, Gardening, Not Architecture, F-Minus (one show), and the Halo Friendlies on tour.

Hunter was featured on Tegan and Sara's 2007 album, The Con, playing bass on the songs written by Tegan. He appeared with them on Late Night with Conan O'Brien playing the shakers on the song "Back in Your Head." He has also confirmed an upcoming side project with Tegan, and contributed lyrics to three of her songs on the 2009 album Sainthood.
He also played bass on Golden Shoulders's "Little Nixon," from their 2009 album Get Reasonable.

He is often referred to simply as "Hunter," as his last name is never given in the list of band members on AFI's albums, with the exception of Crash Love. He plays Fender American Jazz Basses and Ampeg Amps.

In May 2011, when asked why he had stopped recording with his Hunter Revenge project, Burgan stated "I had a lot of fun writing songs in a very specific style. However that is not the only style of music I want to write and can write." He also noted "I'm doing a lot of other music stuff now that's in different styles that are at least a little of a better representation of what I want to do musically."

Burgan joined Alkaline Trio's Matt Skiba and My Chemical Romance's Jarrod Alexander to form Matt Skiba and the Sekrets, which released their debut album Babylon on May 8, 2012.

Discography

With the Force 
 Fettish EP (1996)
 I Don't Like You Either (1997)
 Split EP with the Traitors (1998)
 Complete Discography (2008)

With Badical Turbo Radness 
 To the Rescue (1997)

With AFI 
 Shut Your Mouth and Open Your Eyes (1997)
 A Fire Inside EP (1998)
 Black Sails EP (1999)
 Black Sails in the Sunset (1999)
 All Hallow's EP (1999)
 The Art of Drowning (2000)
 336 (2002)
 Sing the Sorrow (2003)
 Decemberunderground (2006)
 Crash Love (2009)
 Burials (2013)
 AFI (2017)
 Missing Man EP (2018)
Bodies (2021)

With the Frisk 
 Rank Restraint (2001)
 Audio Ransom Note (2003)

With Hunter Revenge 
 Hunter Revenge (2001)

With Tegan and Sara 
 The Con (2007)
 Sainthood (2009)

With Dan and Hunter 
 Dan & Hunter's Holiday EP Volume One (2008)

With Matt Skiba and the Sekrets 
 "Babylon" (2012)
 "Haven't You?" (EP) (2012)
 "Kuts" (2015)

Comics 
Burgan illustrates and writes for the comic series Cat With Matches.

References

External links 
 Hunter Burgan on Blogger
 Hunter Burgan on Twitter
 Hunter Burgan on Tumblr
 Hunter Burgan on VYou

1976 births
Living people
American punk rock bass guitarists
American rock bass guitarists
American male bass guitarists
American punk rock drummers
American male drummers
AFI (band) members
Musicians from Long Beach, California
People from Grass Valley, California
Guitarists from California
American male guitarists
20th-century American drummers
21st-century American drummers
21st-century American bass guitarists